Severino Menardi (9 November 1910 – 13 January 1978) was an Italian cross-country skier, Nordic combined skier, and ski jumper who competed in the 1932 Winter Olympics and in the 1936 Winter Olympics. He was born in Cortina d'Ampezzo.

Biography
In 1932 he finished 21st in the Nordic combined event and 27th in the ski jumping competition. He also participated in the 18 km cross-country skiing event and finished 34th. Four years later he was a member of the Italian relay team which finished fourth in the 4x10 km relay competition. In the 18 km event he finished 16th and in the Nordic combined event he finished 20th.

Achievements

Alpine skiing

National titles
Menardi won five national titles.

Italian Alpine Ski Championships
Downhill: 1931, 1935 (2)
Slalom: 1931 (1)
Combined: 1931, 1935 (2)

Cross-country skiing 
 1933: 2nd, Italian men's championships of cross-country skiing, 18 km
 1935: 3rd, Italian men's championships of cross-country skiing, 18 km
 1938: 1st, Italian men's championships of cross-country skiing, 18 km

Nordic combined 
 1933: 1st, Italian championships of Nordic combined skiing
 1934: 1st, Italian championships of Nordic combined skiing
 1936: 1st, Italian championships of Nordic combined skiing

References

External links
 

1910 births
1978 deaths
Italian male ski jumpers
Italian male cross-country skiers
Italian male Nordic combined skiers
Olympic ski jumpers of Italy
Olympic cross-country skiers of Italy
Olympic Nordic combined skiers of Italy
Ski jumpers at the 1932 Winter Olympics
Cross-country skiers at the 1932 Winter Olympics
Cross-country skiers at the 1936 Winter Olympics
Nordic combined skiers at the 1932 Winter Olympics
Nordic combined skiers at the 1936 Winter Olympics
People from Cortina d'Ampezzo
Alpine skiers of Fiamme Gialle
Sportspeople from the Province of Belluno